Sweden sent a team to compete at the 2008 Summer Olympics in Beijing, People's Republic of China. This is a list of all of the Swedish athletes who participated in the Olympics.

Medalists

Competitors
The following is the list of number of competitors participating in the Games.

Swedish Olympic Committee's website lists 131 participants. Their count also includes reserves: Emma Karlsson and Linda Heed in equestrian, 3 reserves in women's football team, 1 reserve in women's handball team and Robert Svensson in men's table tennis team.

Neither count includes Alexandra Engen who was qualified and selected and was practicing on the Olympic course when she fell and was injured, which caused her to miss the competition.

Archery

Athletics

Men
Track & road events

Field events

Women
Track & road events

Field events

Badminton

Boxing

Canoeing

Sprint

Qualification Legend: QS = Qualify to semi-final; QF = Qualify directly to final

Cycling

Road
Men

Women

Mountain biking

Alexandra Engen was scheduled to participate in women's cross-country. However, she was injured during the practice on the Olympic course and was unable to compete due to that.

Diving

Women

Equestrian

Dressage

Emma Karlsson was a reserve.

Eventing

# - Indicates that points do not count in team total

Show jumping

Linda Heed was reserve.

Fencing

Women

Football

Summary

Women's tournament

Roster

Group play

Quarterfinal

Handball

Summary

Women's tournament

Roster

Group play

Quarterfinal

Classification semifinal

7th–8th place

Rowing

Men

Women

Qualification Legend: FA=Final A (medal); FB=Final B (non-medal); FC=Final C (non-medal); FD=Final D (non-medal); FE=Final E (non-medal); FF=Final F (non-medal); SA/B=Semifinals A/B; SC/D=Semifinals C/D; SE/F=Semifinals E/F; QF=Quarterfinals; R=Repechage

Sailing

Men

Women

Open

M = Medal race; EL = Eliminated – did not advance into the medal race; CAN = Race cancelled

Shooting

Men

Women

Swimming

Men

Women

Table tennis

Singles

Team

Robert Svensson was the reserve for the men's team.

Taekwondo

Tennis

Triathlon

Wrestling

Men's Greco-Roman

* Ara Abrahamian won the bronze medal, but later disqualified and stripped off his medal after a protest during the medal ceremony. He stepped off the podium and put the medal on the floor and walked off, before the gold and silver medals had been awarded.  His action was in protest at a controversial penalty call in his semifinal against Italy's Andrea Minguzzi.  The medal, however, was not awarded to another athlete.  The International Olympic Committee (IOC) said the Swede was punished for violating the spirit of fair play during the medal ceremony.

Women's freestyle

Missing athletes
The following athletes did not qualify for the Olympics despite having won a nomination or being among the top of the world in their sport. This could either be due to injuries, failing to achieve the national and/or international standards or due to heavy competition from fellow Swedish athletes.

Athletics
Robert Kronberg - men's 110 metres hurdles (A - norm, 13.53 July 16, 2008 Luzern)
Christian Olsson - injury, men's triple jump (A - norm, 17.00 July 22, 2008 Stockholm)
Nicklas Wiberg - men's decathlon (A - norm, 8040 June 29, 2008 Jyvaskyla)
Jessica Samuelsson - women's heptathlon (A - norm, 6111 June 1, 2008 Götzis)

See also
 Sweden at the 2008 Summer Paralympics

References 

Nations at the 2008 Summer Olympics
2008
Summer Olympics